Dreams in Formaline is the debut album by industrial metal band Omega Lithium.  It was released on 18 September 2009.

Track listing

Personnel
Mya Mortensen – vocals
Malice Rime – guitars, synthesizers, backing vocals
Zoltan Harpax – bass
Torsten Nihill – drums, percussion

Production
Produced by Victor Love and Omega Lithium.
Recorded by Victor Love at Subsound Studios, Rome.
Mixed by Victor Love and Malice Rime at Subsound Studios, Rome.
Mastered by Vincent Sorg at the Principal Studios, Munster.
Artwork by Seth Siro Anton

2009 debut albums
Omega Lithium albums
Albums with cover art by Spiros Antoniou
Drakkar Entertainment albums